Brereton is a civil parish in Cheshire East, England. It contains 21 buildings that are recorded in the National Heritage List for England as designated listed buildings.  Of these, one is listed at Grade I, the highest grade, three are listed at Grade II*, the middle grade, and the others are at Grade II.  The parish is almost entirely rural.  The major building in the parish is Brereton Hall.  The listed buildings consist of the hall and associated buildings, the church and a sundial in its churchyard, a public house, a former mill, farmhouses and farm buildings, houses or cottages, and three mileposts.

Key

Buildings

See also
Listed buildings in Newbold Astbury
Listed buildings in Bradwall
Listed buildings in Holmes Chapel
Listed buildings in Swettenham
Listed buildings in Sproston
Listed buildings in Sandbach
Listed buildings in Arclid
Listed buildings in Smallwood
Listed buildings in Somerford Booths

References
Citations

Sources

 

 

Listed buildings in the Borough of Cheshire East
Lists of listed buildings in Cheshire